Bernard T. Ferrari is the second and former dean of the Carey Business School of the Johns Hopkins University.

Early life and education 
Ferrari is a cum laude graduate of the University of Rochester from which he also received his M.D. He earned a J.D. magna cum laude from Loyola University School of Law and an M.B.A. from Tulane University Freeman School of Business.

Career 
Ferrari's appointment at the Carey Business School began on July 1, 2012. Ferrari has more than twenty years' of experience as a partner and senior healthcare consultant at the global management consulting firm McKinsey & Company, where he headed the firm's healthcare practice and its North American corporate strategy practice. Prior to joining McKinsey, he was chief operating officer and assistant medical director of the Ochsner Clinic in New Orleans.

Under Ferrari's leadership of the Johns Hopkins Carey Business School, the school earned accreditation from the Association to Advance Collegiate Schools of Business (AACSB), experienced tremendous growth with increased student enrollment, added more full-time faculty, and established new graduate degree programs. He also organized Carey's academic and research initiatives under four key domains: Risk Management, Health Care Management, Real Estate and Infrastructure, and Financial Services.

Bernard T. Ferrari retired on July 1, 2019, as the dean of Johns Hopkins Carey Business School, and was succeeded by Alexander Triantis.

Following his retirement Ferrari was named dean emeritus of the Carey Business School. The distinction was approved by the university's board of trustees and announced by JHU Provost Sunil Kumar at Ferraris farewell in June 2019. Ferrari is the author of the book Power Listening - Mastering the Most Critical Business Skill of All which was published in 2012. The book intends to show readers a process which will help them become active listeners, able to shape and focus any conversation.

Personal life 
He is married to Linda Ferrari, a former commercial banker and active docent at the Metropolitan Museum of Art in New York.

References

Year of birth missing (living people)
Living people
American university and college faculty deans
Johns Hopkins University faculty
University of Rochester alumni
Loyola University New Orleans College of Law alumni
American chief operating officers
Freeman School of Business alumni
McKinsey & Company people